Meiacanthus ditrema, the one-striped poison-fang blenny, is a species of combtooth blenny found in coral reefs in the western Pacific ocean.  This species grows to a length of  TL.

References

External links
 

ditrema
Fish described in 1976